St German's Church is a nineteenth-century Church in Wales parish church in Adamsdown, Cardiff, Wales dedicated to St Germanus of Auxerre, (the Garmon Sant of Welsh tradition).  The building, located on the corner of Star Street and Metal Street, is a Grade I Listed building.

History and architecture

The first church in this locality was established in 1857 in a converted barn and was known as Splott Chapel and as Christ Church. In 1874 this was replaced by a second-hand building made of iron. The population was growing rapidly and this building soon became inadequate. By 1881 the parish had raised £5000 to build a new church. Lord Tredegar donated the land and laid the foundation stone of the new church in April 1882.

The new church was designed by architect George Frederick Bodley, part of architectural partnership Bodley & Garner. It was built between 1881 and 1884. Newman describes the church as "tall, spacious and elegant" and of "widespread influence locally". Among other features of note, high on the south wall of the chancel of St. German's is a particularly finely carved and painted organ case – recently painstakingly restored to its former glory – which was given to the new church by the Rev. Francis Edward Nugee, who spent most of the 1880s as a young curate in the parish of Roath under the Rev. Charles Smythies, who was vicar of Roath until 1883; Smythies went on to become Bishop of British Central Africa (later renamed Nyasaland, now Malawi) and Nugee later married his half-sister, Edith Alston.

In addition to the church there is a school and clergy house next door, built contemporaneously by the same architects.

St German's church was consecrated in March 1886 and the new parish of St German was created in the same month.

In the media
The BBC Radio 4 programme The Daily Service has been broadcast from St German's on several occasions.

References

External links
 
Imaging the Bible in Wales database – List of artworks at the church

Churches completed in 1884
Adamsdown
Gothic Revival church buildings in Wales
Grade I listed churches in Cardiff
George Frederick Bodley church buildings